The Sacred Heart Church is a Catholic church located in Berlin-Prenzlauer Berg, externally built in Neo-Romanesque style. Designed by Christoph Hehl, professor of medieval architecture, the building was completed after 16 months of constructions in 1898. The Neo-Byzantine-style murals inside the church were done by Friedrich Stummel.

Themes of the murals 
The murals of the church:
 Choir:
 Apse: Jesus as Christ Pantocrator, above the Hand of God
 Ceiling of the choir: Sacred Heart, carried by two angels 
 Walls of the choir: Angels carrying Instruments of the Passion
 Arch of the choir:
 Risen Christ with two adoring angels 
 Saints of the local parish: Meinrad of Einsiedeln, Aloysius Gonzaga, Elizabeth of Thuringia, Teresa of Ávila
 On the archway (left and right):
 Ecclesia and Synagoga
 John the Baptist and Simon Petrus
 John the Evangelist and Paul the Apostle
 Dome:
 Lamb of God with the Seven seals and a vexillum, adored by 24 presbyters
 Spandrels (left and right): The Prophets Malachi, Isaia, Ezekiel and Jeremiah
 Eastern transept:
 Mary, Mother of Jesus with two angels, the saints Agnes of Rome, Gertrude of Nivelles and Saint Monica, her son Augustine of Hippo and the saint Hedwig of Silesia
 Western transept:
 Saint Joseph, Alphonsus Liguori, Pope Leo I, the Doctor of the Church Augustine of Hippo and Bernard of Clairvaux
 Under the transept:
 East side: Doubting Thomas with Jesus 
 West side: Simon Petrus sinking in the water, Jesus walking on water
 East side of nave: Jesus and the Samaritan woman at the well
 West side of nave: The sinner washing the feet of Jesus
 Western wall of the central transept: Crucifixion of Jesus
 Eastern wall does not have any murals
 Nave:
 West side: Jesus as a friend of the children
 Ostseite: Jesus is healing and comforting the needy

Bibliography
Irmtraud Thierse. "Katholische Kirche Herz-Jesu Berlin-Prenzlauer Berg". Förderkreis der Herz-Jesu-Kirche in Berlin Prenzlauer Berg e. V. 1998.

External links
 "Herz-Jesu-Kirche", history and data about the Sacred Heart Church (Berlin) at the official website of the city of Berlin (in German)

1890s establishments in Germany
Roman Catholic churches in Berlin
Romanesque Revival church buildings in Germany
Byzantine Revival architecture in Germany
Heritage sites in Berlin